Bettina Korek (born 1978) is an American arts advocate, writer, and the founder of ForYourArt, a public practice organization based in Los Angeles. She founded  ForYourArt a platform to produce and distribute artists’ work. Korek is also a member of the Los Angeles County Arts Commission

Early life and education

Bettina Korek was born and raised in  Southern California.  She grew up in Van Nuys, a suburb of Los Angeles and later in Westwood, to a father in finance and a mother in graphic design.  Her mother often took her on trips “up over the hill” to Los Angeles County Museum of Art (LACMA) and instilled in her a deep passion for the arts.  Korek studied art history at Princeton University and spent a year studying French in Paris.  She returned to Los Angeles after graduation to work in the prints and drawing department of LACMA, where she worked for Kevin Salation. Korek founded ForYourArt to create more public engagement with the growing Los Angeles art scene.

Career

ForYourArt 
Korek founded ForYourArt to create more public engagement with the growing Los Angeles art scene.  The company, which launched in 2006, publishes a weekly newsletter listing art-related events and cultural happenings in Los Angeles. From 2011 to 2015, ForYourArt operated  a brick-and-mortar space in mid-city Los Angeles that hosted short-term events and exhibits in coordination with museums and other partners around the city. The inaugural event was a 24-hour donut buffet in collaboration with LACMA's 24-hour screening of Christian Marclay's The Clock. In 2013 as part of the Hammer Museum’s Arts ReStore LA project, Bettina Korek and ForYourArt transformed an empty Westwood Boulevard storefront into a temporary gallery titled Give Good Art.

Positions and affiliation 
Korek has organized gallery programs for the Getty´s Pacific Standard Time initiative.

Since 2011 Korek has been a member of the Los Angeles County Arts Commission and served as its president from 2016 to 2017.

In 2019 Frieze Fairs was launched in Los Angeles with Korek as executive director of the Southern California fair.

Since March 2020 Korek has been serving as chief executive of the Serpentine Galleries. She replaced Yana Peel.

References

Further reading 
 Finkel J. Bettina Korek. Art + Auction [serial online]. March 2008;31(10):124-125. Available from: Art Source, Ipswich, MA. Accessed March 6, 2016.

External links
 Official Bettina Korek website
 Tumblr: Bettina Korek Archive — written works.
 ForYourArt Archive — ForYourArt at 6020 Wilshire Blvd.

American art writers
American arts administrators
Women arts administrators
Writers from Los Angeles
1978 births
Living people
Art in Greater Los Angeles
People from Van Nuys, Los Angeles
Princeton University alumni